Florentino Alfaro Zamora (died 1871) was a Costa Rican politician.

Zamora was a leader of the 1842 rebellion against Francisco Morazán.

Born in Alajuela, Costa Rica, Florentino Alfaro Zamora would become both a militant and a politician through the course of his life until his death in 1871.  In 1842 he was one of the leaders of the popular insurrection against Francisco Moazán Quesada however, in 1847 he was confined to Térraba under political grounds accompanied by his brother, the ex president José María Alfaro Zamora.

In 1856, he led an expedition to the basin of the San Juan River during the Central American War against William Walker's filibusters, (irregular soldiers).  On the 10th of April, his troops were engaged in combat with filibusters who had invaded Costa Rica on via the margins of the Sardinal River, tributary of the Sarapiquí River.  Costa Ricans conquered and obligated the invaders to retreat, nevertheless suffered numerous casualties which terminated their advance.

Costa Rican politicians
1871 deaths
Year of birth missing
People from Alajuela